Chunyang-myeon (Hangeul: 춘양면, Hanja:春陽面) is a myeon, or a township, in Bonghwa, North Gyeongsang in South Korea. The total area of Chunyang-myeon is 167.28 square kilometers, and, as of 2006, the population was 5,154 people. Chunyang-myeon is further divided into nine "ri", or small villages.

Administrative divisions
Uiyang-ri (의양리)
Haksan-ri (학산리)
Seodong-ri (서동리)
Seokhyeon-ri (석현리)
Aedang-ri (애당리)
Dosim-ri (도심리)
Seobyeok-ri (서벽리)
Uguchi-ri (우구치리)
Soro-ri (소로리)

Schools
Chunyang Elementary School(춘양초등학교) in Uiyang-ri.
Seobyeok Elementary School (서벽초등학교) in Seobyeok-ri.
Seobyeok Middle School (서벽중학교) in seobyeok-ri
Chunyang Middle School (춘양중학교) in Seodong-ri with a branch facility in Seobyeok-ri.
Korea forest science high school  (한국산림과학고) in Seodong-ri.

Sources

External links
  Chunyang-myeon Office Homepage
 Tourist Map of Bonghwa county including Chunyang-myeon

Bonghwa County
Towns and townships in North Gyeongsang Province